Halden District Court is a district court located in Halden, Norway.  It covers the municipalities of Halden and Aremark  and is subordinate Borgarting Court of Appeal.

References

External links 
Official site 

Defunct district courts of Norway
Organisations based in Halden